= Lynwood Baptist Church =

Church in Cape Girardeau, Missouri, US

Coordinates: 37°20′21″N 89°34′55″W

Lynwood Baptist Church is a Baptist church located in Cape Girardeau, Missouri. It is affiliated with the Southern Baptist Convention. In 2018, Lynwood reported 873 in average weekly attendance.

== History ==
Lynwood Baptist Church began in 1959 with a congregation of 27 with the opening of the Third Baptist Church on the north side of Cape Girardeau, Missouri. The church remained known as Third Baptist Church until 1965. At that time the church's name was changed to its current moniker with the assistance of the First Baptist Church of Cape Girardeau.

Groundbreaking for the first Lynwood Baptist Church location took place in January 1961 at Lynnwood and Randol Streets. The first service held at that location was on March 4, 1962. In 1996 Lynwood relocated to a new location off Highway 61 and Route W allowing 24 acres for church development.
